Damdarreh-ye Bibi Roshteh (also Romanized as Damdarreh-ye Bībī Roshteh; also known as Damdarreh and Dom Darreh) is a village in Alqchin Rural District, in the Central District of Charam County, Kohgiluyeh and Boyer-Ahmad Province, Iran. At the 2006 census, its population was 177, in 33 families.

References 

Populated places in Charam County